Mount Minnie Station, often referred to as Mount Minnie, is a pastoral lease that once operated as a sheep station but now operates as a cattle station.

The property was pioneered by Kenneth Durwent Messer. It was once part of the Gifford Creek lease, which was owned by Septimus Burt. The station takes its name from the nearby Minnie Creek. In 1913 a stone homestead was built on the property.

See also
List of ranches and stations
List of pastoral leases in Western Australia

References

Pastoral leases in Western Australia
Stations (Australian agriculture)
Pilbara